The Workers' Left Front – Unity (FIT-U) is an alliance of initially three Trotskyist parties in Argentina formed to fight a number of elections in 2011, announced at a press conference in April that year.  They are the Workers' Party (PO), the Socialist Workers' Party (PTS), and Socialist Left (IS). In 2019, the Workers' Socialist Movement (MST) joined the alliance.

These parties had stood separately at the Argentine elections of 2007 and 2009, the PO on its own, and the PTS and IS in an alliance with the Movement for Socialism (MAS). At these two elections the PO did better than the PTS-IS-MAS alliance, and in 2009 both groupings seriously increased their vote in proportion to their vote in 2007.

History

2011
On 12 June they won a provincial deputy in Neuquén Province with 3.60% of the vote. The post will be held in rotation by Alejandro López, Raúl Godoy (PTS), Angélica Lagunas (IS) and Gabriela Suppicich (PO).  (However the deputies elected in June only took their seats on 10 December 2011, so each of the four sit for a year running from December to December.)

On 24 July, in the town of Capitán Bermúdez in Santa Fe Province, the PO had a councillor elected, Jorgelina Signa, with 17% of the vote.

On 7 August Liliana Olivero of IS was re-elected to the Córdoba provincial legislature, this post will be rotated with Cintia Frencia (PO) and Laura Vilches (PTS).  The list won 3.12% of the vote, this was largely concentrated in the provincial capital where it won 5.45%.

They stood Jorge Altamira of the PO for president and Christian Castillo of the PTS for vice-president on 23 October.  On 14 August Altamira and Castillo won 527,237 votes, 2.46%, in a primary election.

On 23 October 2011 they came very close to winning a national deputy in two areas.  In Buenos Aires city their vote was only 0.2% short.  In Buenos Aires Province their share of the vote would have entitled them to a deputy, but they fell at a second hurdle where they needed to win 3% of the number of voters on the electoral register.  The Front mounted a legal challenge to this hurdle, but the courts turned them down.

The Front participated in mobilisations in June 2012.  In 2013 it put forward proposals to limit officials' salaries.

2013
The Front contested the election for Neuquén city council on 30 June 2013.  It won 5.7% of the vote, around double its vote for this election in 2011, and roughly in line with its vote in the provincial election that year.  Soon after it announced its candidates for the national election.

At the primary elections on 11 August 2013 the Front won over 900 000 votes, fairly close to doubling its vote compared to 2011.  It increased its vote in nearly all provinces, in some provinces picking up a significant vote from virtually nowhere, an exception was Buenos Aires city where its vote was down marginally on 2011.

On 6 October the PO had a strong performance in provincial primary elections in Salta Province, winning 22% in Salta city.

At the main election on 27 October they won over a million votes, 5.11%, more than double their vote in 2011.  They won three national deputies: Néstor Pitrola (PO) in Buenos Aires Province, Pablo Sebastián López (PO) in Salta and Nicolás del Caño (PTS) in Mendoza.  There was a challenge to the result in Córdoba Province, where Liliana Olivero (IS) was the candidate.

They also won three provincial deputies (Cecilia Soria, Martín Dalmau and Héctor Fresina) and a provincial senator (Noelia Barbeito) in Mendoza, and one provincial deputy in each of Buenos Aires City (Marcelo Ramal), Buenos Aires Province (Christian Castillo) and Santiago del Estero (Andrea Ruiz), and five new councillors, all in towns in Mendoza Province.

On 10 November the PO had a serious success in provincial elections in Salta Province, winning a provincial senator (Gabriela Cerrano) and four provincial deputies (Julio Quintana, Claudio del Plá, Gabriela Jorge and Norma Colpari) all elected in the provincial capital.  They also won 17 councilors, including 9 out of the 21 seats on Salta city council, where the PO is now the largest party.

2014
On 29 January the Front registered its alliance to contest the municipal election in Mendoza Province.  In Mendoza, Argentina the list was headed by Macarena Escudero (PTS), a student, followed by Soledad Sosa and Andrés Elías (both PO). The PO headed the list in San Carlos, Mendoza.

On 30 March the Front received 13.5% of the vote in Mendoza city, so Macarena Escudero was elected as a councillor.

2015
The Front's first election of 2015 was local primary elections on 22 February in Mendoza.  The Front came 2nd with 16% of the vote, and Andrés Elías is predicted to be elected as a city councilor.

In April it won a second provincial deputy in Neuquén.  The seats will be held by Raúl Godoy (PTS) and Patricia Jure (PO), to be followed by Angélica Lagunas (IS).  It also won a councilor in the town of Andacollo for the first time.

In June in Mendoza Province Macarena Escudero was elected as a provincial deputy, and Víctor da Vila was elected as a provincial senator.

In the presidential elections, two formulas competed in the primaries in August: one represented by Nicolas del Caño and Myriam Bregman (both from the PTS) against another composed of Jorge Altamira (PO) and Juan Carlos Giordano (IS — Socialist Left). The PTS formula won, with 375,874 votes against 356,977 of the PO+IS one, both adding up to a 3.25% of the total vote. On the main elections in October, Nestor Pitrola was elected as a national deputy for the Buenos Aires province, becoming the fourth Workers' Left Front deputy in the chamber, while the presidential formula headed by Del Caño got 812.530 votes, a 3.23% of the total.

2019
After several weeks of meetings, the Workers' Socialist Movement (MST) agreed on June 11, 2019 to join the Front for the October general election.

2021
At the 2021 Argentine legislative election the Front had its best performance yet, winning 5.91% of the vote and four seats in the national Chamber of Deputies (two in Buenos Aires Province, one each in Buenos Aires City and Jujuy Province).

See also
United Socialist Workers' Party (Argentina)

References

External links
PO article (Spanish) 
PTS article (Spanish)
Programme of the Workers' Left Front (English)
Castillo on result of primary elections (English)
Manifesto for the 2013 election
Front's election bulletin page
Map of performance at August 2013 primaries
Map of performance at October 2013 main election
Argentine socialist speaks in Belfast, Dublin (English)

2011 establishments in Argentina
Communist parties in Argentina
Left-wing political party alliances
Political parties established in 2011
Political party alliances in Argentina
Trotskyist organisations in Argentina
Argentina